Lois Maureen Stapleton (June 21, 1925 – March 13, 2006) was an American actress. She received numerous accolades, including an Academy Award, a Golden Globe Award, a BAFTA Award, a Primetime Emmy Award, and two Tony Awards, in addition to a nomination for a Grammy Award.

She was nominated for the Academy Award for Best Supporting Actress for Lonelyhearts (1958), Airport (1970), and Interiors (1978), before winning for her performance as Emma Goldman in Reds (1981). For Reds, Stapleton also won the BAFTA Award for Best Actress in a Supporting Role. She was nominated for five Golden Globe Awards, winning for Airport. Other notable film roles included Bye Bye Birdie (1963), Plaza Suite (1971), The Fan (1981), Cocoon (1985), and The Money Pit (1986).

She was nominated for seven Emmy Awards and won one for the television film Among the Paths to Eden (1967).

Stapleton made her Broadway debut in 1946 in The Playboy of the Western World, and went on to win the 1951 Tony Award for Best Featured Actress in a Play for The Rose Tattoo and the 1971 Tony Award for Best Actress in a Play for The Gingerbread Lady. She received four additional Tony Award nominations and was inducted into the American Theatre Hall of Fame in 1981.

She was "almost an EGOT," having won the Triple Crown of Acting, every major performing award except a Grammy, for which she was nominated in 1975.

Early life
Stapleton was born in Troy, New York, the daughter of John P. Stapleton and Irene (née Walsh), and grew up in a strict Irish American Catholic family. Her father was an alcoholic and her parents separated during her childhood.

Career

Stapleton moved to New York City at the age of 18, and worked as a salesgirl, hotel clerk, and modeled to pay the bills, including for artist Raphael Soyer. She once said that it was her infatuation with the handsome Hollywood actor Joel McCrea which led her into acting. She made her Broadway debut in the production featuring Burgess Meredith of The Playboy of the Western World in 1946. That same year, she played the role of "Iras" in Shakespeare's Antony and Cleopatra in a touring production by actress and producer Katharine Cornell. Stepping in because Anna Magnani refused the role due to her limited English, Stapleton won a Tony Award for her role in Tennessee Williams' The Rose Tattoo in 1951 (Magnani's English improved, however, and she was able to play the role in the film version, winning an Oscar).

Stapleton played in other Williams' productions, including Twenty-Seven Wagons Full of Cotton and Orpheus Descending (and its film adaptation, The Fugitive Kind, co-starring her friend Marlon Brando), as well as in The Cold Wind and the Warm (Tony nomination, 1959) and Lillian Hellman's Toys in the Attic (1960), for which she received another Tony Award nomination. She was nominated for a Tony Award for Neil Simon's Plaza Suite in 1968 and won a second Tony Award for Simon's The Gingerbread Lady, which was written especially for her, in 1971. Later Broadway roles included a Tony-nominated turn as "Birdie" in The Little Foxes, opposite Elizabeth Taylor, and as a replacement for Jessica Tandy in The Gin Game.

Stapleton's film career, though limited, brought her immediate success, with her debut in Lonelyhearts (1958) earning nominations for an Academy Award for Best Supporting Actress and a Golden Globe Award. She appeared in the 1963 film version of Bye Bye Birdie, in the role of Mama Mae Peterson, with Dick Van Dyke, Janet Leigh, Paul Lynde, and Ann-Margret. Stapleton played the role of Dick Van Dyke's mother, even though she was only five months and 22 days older than Van Dyke. She was nominated again for an Oscar for Airport (Golden Globe Award nomination, 1970) and Woody Allen's Interiors (Golden Globe Award nomination, 1978). She won the Best Supporting Actress Oscar for Reds (1981), directed by Warren Beatty, in which she portrayed the Lithuanian-born anarchist, Emma Goldman. In her acceptance speech, she stated, "I would like to thank everyone I've ever met in my entire life." Her later appearances included Johnny Dangerously (1984), Cocoon (1985), and its sequel Cocoon: The Return (1988). 

Stapleton won a 1968 Emmy Award for her performance in Among the Paths of Eden and was nominated for six more, for Avonlea (1996), Miss Rose White (1992), B.L. Stryker (1989), the television version of All the King's Men (1959), Queen of the Stardust Ballroom (1975), and The Gathering (1977), and Kraft Theatre (1959). She also appeared opposite Laurence Olivier and Natalie Wood in Cat on a Hot Tin Roof (1976).

She was inducted into the American Theatre Hall of Fame in 1981. She was an alumna of the famous Actors Studio in New York City, led by Lee Strasberg, where she became friends with Marilyn Monroe, who was only one year younger than Stapleton. She was impressed with Monroe's talent, and always thought it was a shame that Monroe was rarely allowed to play roles beyond the ditzy blonde. By comparison, Stapleton thought herself lucky: "I never had that problem. People looked at me on stage and said, 'Jesus, that broad better be able to act.'" One of the most famously remembered scenes at the studio was when Stapleton and Monroe acted in Anna Christie together.

Despite her association with Strasberg, Stapleton cited Mira Rostova as her most influential acting teacher. She appeared with Rostova and another of Rostova's pupils, Montgomery Clift, Off-Broadway in The Sea Gull (1954).

She was nominated for a 1975 Grammy Award for the spoken word recording of To Kill a Mockingbird.

She hosted the 19th episode of Season 4 of NBC's Saturday Night Live in 1979.

Personal life and death
Stapleton's first husband was Max Allentuck, general manager to the producer Kermit Bloomgarden, and her second was playwright David Rayfiel, from whom she divorced in 1966. She had a son, Daniel, and a daughter, Katherine, by her first husband. Her daughter, Katherine Allentuck, played a single movie role, that of "Aggie" in Summer of '42 (Stapleton herself also had a minor, uncredited role in the film as the protagonist's mother, though only her voice is heard; she does not appear on camera). Her son, Daniel Allentuck, is a documentary filmmaker.

Stapleton suffered from anxiety and alcoholism for many years, and once told an interviewer, "The curtain came down, and I went into the vodka." She also said that her unhappy childhood contributed to her insecurities, which included a fear of flying, airplanes, and elevators. A lifelong heavy smoker, Stapleton died of chronic obstructive pulmonary disease in 2006 at her home in Lenox, Massachusetts.

In 1981 Hudson Valley Community College in Stapleton's childhood city of Troy, New York, dedicated a theater in her name.

She was not related through her father to All In the Family star Jean Stapleton (who used her mother's maiden name professionally).

Filmography

Film

Television

Stage

References

External links 
 
 
 
 
 Maureen Stapleton at the University of Wisconsin's Actors Studio audio collection
 Maureen Stapleton Papers. Yale Collection of American Literature, Beinecke Rare Book and Manuscript Library, Yale University.

1925 births
2006 deaths
20th-century American actresses
21st-century American actresses
Actors from Troy, New York
American film actresses
American people of Irish descent
American stage actresses
American television actresses
Best Supporting Actress Academy Award winners
Best Supporting Actress BAFTA Award winners
Best Supporting Actress Golden Globe (film) winners
Caedmon Records artists
Catholics from Massachusetts
Catholics from New York (state)
Respiratory disease deaths in Massachusetts
Deaths from chronic obstructive pulmonary disease
Drama Desk Award winners
Outstanding Performance by a Lead Actress in a Miniseries or Movie Primetime Emmy Award winners
People from Lenox, Massachusetts
Tony Award winners